Sri Kanda Leela is a 1938 Indian Tamil language film directed by H. S. Mehta.

Cast 
The following details were taken from the company song book.

Production 
The film was produced by M. A. S. Sellam and Co, Kovai Premier Cinetone and directed by H. S. Mehta. L. Najappa Chettiar wrote the screenplay, dialogues and songs. Cinematography was done by J. S. Patel. Meenakshisundara Nattuvanar directed the choreography.

Soundtrack 
The music was composed by G. Govindarajulu while the lyrics were penned by L. Nanjappa Chettiar. Some folk devotional songs and one Thiruppugal was included in the film. Altogether there were 25 songs in the film. 
All the songs were sung by the actors featuring the respective characters.

References

External links 
 - A song from the film